Amirabad (also Romanized as Amīrābād) is a village in Padena-ye Olya Rural District, Padena District, Semirom County, Isfahan Province, Iran. At the 2016 census, its population was 378, in 118 families.

References 

Populated places in Semirom County